Michael Wolfgramm (born 8 March 1953) is a German rower who competed for the SC Dynamo Berlin / Sportvereinigung (SV) Dynamo. He won the medals at the international rowing competitions for East Germany.

References

External links 
 

1953 births
Living people
East German male rowers
Olympic medalists in rowing
Olympic gold medalists for East Germany
Olympic rowers of East Germany
Rowers at the 1976 Summer Olympics
Medalists at the 1976 Summer Olympics
People from Schwerin